The School of Dance and Circus (DOCH) was, until 2014, a Swedish institution offering higher education in the fields of dance education, folk dance, dance, dance therapy, historical dance, choreography and contemporary circus. Since 1 January 2014 it has been a part of Stockholm University of the Arts, and the previous name is no longer used.  DOCH was founded as the Institute of Choreography (Koreografiska institutet) in 1963; in 1978 it was renamed the University College of Dance, “Danshögskolan”; in 2010 it became the University of Dance and Circus, "Dans och Cirkushögskolan" (DOCH). It operated under the Ministry of Education, and was fully funded by the government and therefore had no tuition fees for Swedish and EU citizens.

Circus programme
Attendance at the circus school was awarded on the basis of live auditions held in Stockholm, with tests of physical strength, flexibility, endurance, and theatrical skill. In addition, each applicant was required to give a demonstration of their own performance specialty.

The program, headed by Ivar Heckscher, trained students in acrobatics, equilibristics, aerial technique, and juggling. In addition, each student received advanced training in at least one discipline. The neocircus program included theoretical studies to complement each student's personal artistic development.

Until 2007, no Americans had ever been accepted into the neocircus program.  In June 2007, American juggler Wes Peden became one of 16 students chosen from 68 candidates, who were culled from 200 applicants.

Vice-chancellors
 2006–2013 Efva Lilja
 1996–2005 Kari Sylwan
 1976–1996 Lena Malmsjö
 1971–1976 Lilian Runestam
 1963–1971 Bengt Häger
 1963 Birgit Cullberg

References 

Stockholm University of the Arts
Performing arts education in Sweden
Higher education in Stockholm
Dance education organizations
Circus schools